The South African Confederation of Cue Sport (SACCS) is the governing body of  cue sports in South Africa. SACCS is responsible for the promotion and development of the combination of pool, carom and snooker, and is affiliated to SASCOC.

SACCS aims to reverse cue sport’s reputation in South Africa from being a more recreational one to a full-fledged sport with its Long Term Participant Development (LTPD) plan, by attracting new participants, starting with the identification of talent and exposing these new talents to a high quality of coaching and competitive tournaments.

Affiliate members
This is a list of affiliated members of SACCS according to its constitution.

 Pool South Africa (PSA)
 South African Blackball Federation (SABF)
  Snooker and Billiards South Africa (SABSA)
  Pool 4 Change (P4C) - Development

See also
 Sport in South Africa
 South African Amateur Championship (snooker)
 Glossary of cue sports terms

References

External links
 Official website

Cue sports in South Africa
Cue sports
Cue sports governing bodies
Sports organizations established in 2006
2006 establishments in South Africa